Gornja Lovnica is a village in the municipality of Rožaje, Montenegro.

Demographics
According to the 2011 census, its population was 361.

References

Populated places in Rožaje Municipality